Lucinda Williams (later Adams, born August 10, 1937) is a retired American sprinter. She won a gold medal in the 4×100 m relay at the 1960 Olympics, but failed to reach the finals of the individual 100 m and 200 m events in 1956 and 1960. She earned three gold medals at the 1959 Pan American Games in these three events. In 1994 she was inducted into the Georgia Sports Hall of Fame.

References

1937 births
Living people
Sportspeople from Savannah, Georgia
American female sprinters
Tennessee State Lady Tigers track and field athletes
Olympic gold medalists for the United States in track and field
Athletes (track and field) at the 1956 Summer Olympics
Athletes (track and field) at the 1959 Pan American Games
Athletes (track and field) at the 1960 Summer Olympics
Medalists at the 1960 Summer Olympics
Pan American Games gold medalists for the United States
Pan American Games medalists in athletics (track and field)
Track and field athletes from Georgia (U.S. state)
Medalists at the 1959 Pan American Games
Olympic female sprinters